Raveendra  may refer to

Raveendra Geethangal, music album
Stephen Raveendra, Indian police officer
Raveendra Wimalasiri, Sri Lankan cricketer